Route 149 is a highway in northern Missouri.  Its northern terminus is at the Iowa state line where it continues as Appanoose County Route T30; its southern terminus is at U.S. Route 36 south of New Cambria.

Major intersections

References

149
Transportation in Macon County, Missouri
Transportation in Adair County, Missouri
Transportation in Putnam County, Missouri